Next is a one-act play by Terrence McNally. The play opened Off-Broadway in 1969.

Plot
At the comedy's center are Marion Cheever, a middle-aged, overweight, debt-ridden, divorced father of two who mistakenly has been called by the draft, and Sergeant Thech, a no-nonsense female examining officer. A battle-of-wits is waged between the "sad sack" determined to avoid military service and the career officer just as determined to sign him up.

Starting out as an amusing incident, Cheever ends up showing "hatred and contempt" for his country.

Production history
The original version of Next premiered at the White Barn Theatre, Westport, Connecticut on July 16, 1967. The play was then produced on television Channel 13 in New York City in March 1968. The role of Marion Cheever was played by James Coco.

Paired with Elaine May's Adaptation, Next opened Off-Broadway at the Greenwich Mews Theatre on February 10, 1969, where it ran for 707 performances. James Coco and Elaine Shore were directed by May. Elaine May won the 1969 Outer Critics Circle Award, Best Director.

Critical response
Clive Barnes, reviewing for the New York Times, wrote that the two plays "are just plain marvelous-funny, provocative and, in their way, touching". Of Coco's victim, "This is gorgeous acting, rich, stylish, impeccable."

Peter Wolfe (professor of English at the University of Missouri-St. Louis) wrote of the play : "...the line between victim and tormentor blurs...part of the play's merit stems from both the ambiguity of McNally's attitude towards his people and his ironical treatment of them."

Further reading
 Terrence McNally : 15 short plays, Terrence McNally, Smith and Kraus, Lyme, NH, c1994,

References

External links
 Lortel Archives listing

1969 plays
Plays by Terrence McNally
One-act plays
Comedy plays